Gnathoenia tropica is a species of beetle in the family Cerambycidae. It was described by Duvivier in 1891. It is known from Cameroon, Equatorial Guinea, the Democratic Republic of the Congo, and Gabon. It contains the varietas Gnathoenia tropica var. irrorata.

References

Ceroplesini
Beetles described in 1891